El amor ajeno (English title: The love of others) is a Mexican telenovela produced by Irene Sabido for Televisa in 1983. It is an adaptation of the telenovela Entre brumas produced in 1973.

Irma Lozano and Jorge Lavat starred as protagonists, while Úrsula Prats starred as the main antagonist.

Cast 
Irma Lozano as Deborah
Jorge Lavat as Charlie
Ramón Pons as Pablo Medina
Bertha Moss as Sara
Kitty de Hoyos as Susana/Ivonne
Miguel Manzano as Jaime de la Serna
Úrsula Prats as Úrsula
Tony Carbajal as Oscar Enriquez
Manuel Ojeda as Roberto
Fabian as Juan Luis
Manuel Capetillo Jr. as Gonzalo
Elizabeth Aguilar as María
Karmen Erpenbach as Elisa
Hector Flores as Alfredo
Irma Porter as Margarita
Patricia Thomas as Loris

Awards

References

External links 

Mexican telenovelas
1983 telenovelas
Televisa telenovelas
Spanish-language telenovelas
1983 Mexican television series debuts
1984 Mexican television series endings